GoIF Ginsten is a Swedish football club located in Falkenberg.

Background
GoIF Ginsten currently plays in Division 4 Halland Elit which is the sixth tier of Swedish football. They play their home matches at the Ginstavallen in Falkenberg.

The club is affiliated to Hallands Fotbollförbund.

Season to season

Footnotes

External links
 GoIF Ginsten – Official website

Football clubs in Halland County
Association football clubs established in 1935
1935 establishments in Sweden